Weekend Special is the debut studio album released by Brenda and the Big Dudes on the CCP Records label in 1983. It was produced by Mally Watson  and Blondie Makhene. Weekend Special spawned two singles "Weekend Special" and "You Just Need Someone". The album sold over 200 000 copies in South Africa by the end of 1984.

Background
In 1980, one of the singers from the group Joy fell pregnant (Anneline Malebo) went on maternity leave. Fassie who lived with producer Hendrick "Koloi" Lebona at the time, was called by Joy's management to stand in for Malebo. Following the return of Malebo, Fassie left the band and joined Blondie and Papa [Makhene] as a backup singer before starting her own band, Brenda and the Big Dudes, which is composed of Desmond Malotana (keyboards), Dumisane Ngubeni (keyboards), Job "Fats" Mlangeni (drums), David Mabaso (bass), Rufus Klaas (guitar) and Fassie (vocals).

Tracklist
Adapted from Allmusic

Personnel

'Brenda and the Big Dudes'

Brenda Fassie - Vocals, Composer
Desmond Malotana - (Keyboards) *Dumisane Ngubeni - (Keyboards)
Job "Fats" Mlangeni - (Drums), 
David Mabaso - (Bass)
Rufus Klaas - (Guitar)

'Additional personnel'

Hugo Dwyer - Engineer, Mixing
Wayne Edwards *Executive Producer
Van Gibbs - Arranger, Emulator, Producer, Remixing, Synthesizer
Franklin Grant - Engineer
Blondie Makhene - Producer (track 1)
Nicky Marrero - Timbales
Billy Miranda - Assistant Engineer
Cirland Noel - Assistant Engineer
Jerome Najee Rasheed - Sax (Alto)
Jose Rodrigues - Mastering
Bob Bachman - Edited By 
V. Jeffrey Smith - Sax (Tenor), Soloist
Akili Walker - Engineer
Tom Weber - Engineer

References

1989 albums
Brenda Fassie albums